Pure Grit is a 1923 American silent Western film directed by Nat Ross and starring Roy Stewart, Esther Ralston, and Jack Mower. It is based on the 1911 novel A Texas Ranger by William MacLeod Raine.

Plot
As described in a film magazine review, Bob Evans, a Texas Ranger, falls in love with school teacher Stella Bolling. She aids Jim Kemp, a wounded stranger, who reveals himself to be her long-lost brother, who had broken out of jail. Buddy Clark, an orphan also cared for by Stella, rescues another wounded man, and learns from him that he is really Stella's brother, and that Stella is being imposed on by the other stranger. Stella has gone with the stranger. Bob pursues them and saves Stella from an attack by the stranger at a burning cabin, who meets his just deserts. Buddy also saves a dog from the burning cabin. Bob has won Stella's affection.

Cast
 Roy Stewart as Bob Evans
 Esther Ralston as Stella Bolling
 Jere Austin as Jim Kemp
 Jack Mower as Frank Bolling
 Verne Winter as Buddy Clark
 Wesley Barry as Newsboy (uncredited)

References

Bibliography
 Connelly, Robert B. The Silents: Silent Feature Films, 1910-36, Volume 40, Issue 2. December Press, 1998.
 Munden, Kenneth White. The American Film Institute Catalog of Motion Pictures Produced in the United States, Part 1. University of California Press, 1997.

External links
 

1923 films
1923 Western (genre) films
1920s English-language films
American silent feature films
Silent American Western (genre) films
Films directed by Nat Ross
American black-and-white films
Universal Pictures films
1920s American films